SLSCO or Sullivan Land Services Co. is a Galveston, Texas based construction company that participates in large American government projects. It is owned by Sullivan Interests, founded by brothers John, Billy and Todd Sullivan in 1995.

SLSCO built Texas International Terminals, a deepwater port.

SLSCO and DRC Emergency Services (DRC, also a Sullivan Interests company) lobbied and worked in New York after Hurricane Sandy on a $290 million contract. They also had a $375 million contract for work after Hurricane Maria in New Orleans and did work rebuilding in Haiti after the 2010 Haiti earthquake. DRC did cleanup work in Texas following 2017's Hurricane Harvey, including a $40 million debris removal contract.

SLSCO received contracts to build sections of the Trump wall, including the $145 million for the first new sections completed in Hidalgo County, Texas, $147 million to replace sections near San Diego, California, and $61 million for a section in New Mexico.

In 2020, SLSCO received a contract to build field hospitals at the USTA Billie Jean King National Tennis Center near Queens, New York City, and another at the Brooklyn Cruise Terminal. The Billie Jean King hospital was designed to reduce pressure on Elmhurst Hospital Center. The field hospital had capacity for 350 beds and was open on April 10, 2020. Built at the cost of $22–52 million, it only saw 79 patients before closing a month later. The $21 million cruise terminal hospital had 750 beds, but didn't open until May 4, nearly a month after New York City's coronavirus peak; hospital populations had fallen in half. It was closed weeks later without being used. It paid doctors $900/hour with overtime, and paid nurses $250 for standard hours. On April 27, the facility was converted to a 100-bed facility and used to hold houseless people who were quarantining. It finally closed on May 13. SLSCO also did pandemic work for Florida on a no-bid $283 million contract, building overflow hospitals. This included reopening and operating the Pan American Hospital in Miami.

SLSCO employs lobbyists. For instance, in February and March during the COVID-19 pandemic, they were spending $15,000 per month to lobby New York City's emergency management department.

SLSCO received a contract in 2022 to build a 1000-bed tent shelter for migrants in Bronx, New York City.

See also
 USNS Comfort
 Javits Center
 Fisher Industries

References

Companies based in Galveston, Texas